The Armstrong Siddeley Genet Major is a British five-cylinder (later seven-cylinder), air-cooled, radial engine for aircraft, designed and built by Armstrong Siddeley and first run in 1928. It developed 140 horsepower (104 kW). In Royal Air Force use the seven-cylinder version was known as the Civet I. The Feliform names used are in line with company convention, the Genet and Civet both being large cat-like carnivores.

Variants and applications

Genet Major I
The Genet Major 1 was a five-cylinder engine of  that was closely related to the Genet I but with increased bore and stroke.

 Avro Avian
 Avro 619
 Avro 624
 Avro 638 Club Cadet
 Cierva C.19 Autogiro
 Civilian Coupé
 Saro Cutty Sark
 Southern Martlet
 Westland IV

Genet Major 1A (Civet I)

 ANBO V (upgrade)
 Avro Avian
 Avro Cadet
 Avro Rota
 Cierva C.30A Autogiro
 RWD-6 (not specified 7-cylinder Genet Major sub-type)
 Saro Cutty Sark
 SEA-1
 Westland Wessex

Genet Major III
As Genet Major IA but with cylinders using cast rocker boxes.

Genet Major IV
A geared propeller drive version of the Genet Major IA, .

 ANBO 51

Survivors
An Armstrong Siddeley Genet Major powers Southern Martlet (G-AAYX) which is owned and operated by the Shuttleworth Collection at Old Warden and flies at home air displays throughout the summer months.
An Armstrong Siddeley Genet Major 1A engine also powers the only surviving Civilian Aircraft Co.Ltd. 1931 vintage Civilian Coupe 02 monoplane (G-ABNT), which is airworthy and owned and operated by Shipping and Airlines Ltd based at Biggin Hill Airport, England.

Engines on display
 An Armstrong Siddeley Genet Major IA is on display at the Royal Air Force Museum Cosford.
  An Armstrong Siddeley Genet Major IV can be seen in Polish Aviation Museum in Cracow.
Aviation Heritage Museum (Western Australia)

Specifications (Genet Major IA/Civet I)

See also

References

Notes

Bibliography

 
 Lumsden, Alec. British Piston Engines and their Aircraft. Marlborough, Wiltshire: Airlife Publishing, 2003. .

Genet Major
1920s aircraft piston engines
Aircraft air-cooled radial piston engines